

Station List

Ha

He

Hi

Ho

Hu - Hy

H